Pyrausta grisealis is a moth in the family Crambidae. It was described by Koen V. N. Maes in 2009. It is found in Namibia.

References

Endemic fauna of Namibia
Moths described in 2009
grisealis
Moths of Africa